

Acronyms 
 SAMI, Synchronized Accessible Media Interchange, a closed-captioning format developed by Microsoft
 Saudi Arabian Military Industries, a government-owned defence company
 South African Malaria Initiative, a virtual expertise network of malaria researchers

People
 Samee, also spelled Sami, a male given name
 Sami (name), including lists of people with the given name or surname
 Sámi people, indigenous people of the Scandinavian Peninsula, the Kola Peninsula, Karelia and Finland
 Sámi cuisine
 Sámi languages, of the Sami people
 Sámi shamanism, a faith of the Sami people

Places
 Sápmi, a cultural region in Northern Europe
 Sami (ancient city), in Elis, Greece
 Sami Bay, east of Sami, Cephalonia
 Sami District, Gambia
 Sami, Burkina Faso, a district of the Banwa Province
 Sami, Cephalonia, a municipality in  Greece
 Sami, Gujarat, a town in Patan district of Gujarat, India
 Sami, Paletwa, a town in Chin State, Myanmar
 Sämi, a village in Lääne-Viru County in northeastern Estonia

Other uses
 Sami, a common name for Prosopis cineraria, a tree

See also
 Karuppu Sami, a Tamil deity
 Saamy, a 2003 Tamil film
 Sami (chimpanzee), chimpanzee who was kept at the Belgrade Zoo
 Sámi Radio (disambiguation)
 Sammi (disambiguation)
 Samy (disambiguation)

Language and nationality disambiguation pages